Mićo Vranješ (born 8 September 1975) is a Serbian former footballer who played as a defender.

Club career
After playing for Vojvodina, Smiljanić moved abroad and joined Bulgarian club CSKA Sofia in 2000. He would also play professionally in Russia (Uralan Elista), Hungary (Pécs), and Poland (Groclin Dyskobolia).

International career
At international level, Smiljanić was capped for FR Yugoslavia U21.

Notes

References

External links
 
 

1975 births
Living people
Footballers from Novi Sad
Serbia and Montenegro footballers
Serbian footballers
Association football defenders
Serbia and Montenegro under-21 international footballers
FK Vojvodina players
PFC CSKA Sofia players
FC Elista players
Pécsi MFC players
Dyskobolia Grodzisk Wielkopolski players
OFK Mladenovac players
First League of Serbia and Montenegro players
Russian Premier League players
Nemzeti Bajnokság I players
Ekstraklasa players
Serbian First League players
Serbia and Montenegro expatriate footballers
Serbian expatriate footballers
Expatriate footballers in Bulgaria
Expatriate footballers in Russia
Expatriate footballers in Hungary
Expatriate footballers in Poland
Serbia and Montenegro expatriate sportspeople in Bulgaria
Serbia and Montenegro expatriate sportspeople in Russia
Serbia and Montenegro expatriate sportspeople in Hungary
Serbia and Montenegro expatriate sportspeople in Poland